Mon Chong is a tambon (subdistrict) of Omkoi District, in Chiang Mai Province, Thailand. In 2017 it had a population of 5,809 people.

History
The subdistrict was created effective 1 April 1982 by splitting off eight administrative villages from Mae Tuen.

Administration

Central administration
The tambon is divided into nine administrative villages (mubans).

Local administration
The area of the subdistrict is covered by the subdistrict administrative organization (SAO) Mon Chong (องค์การบริหารส่วนตำบลม่อนจอง).

References

External links
Thaitambon.com on Mon Chong

Tambon of Chiang Mai province
Populated places in Chiang Mai province